Varbola is a village in Märjamaa Parish, Rapla County in western Estonia.

See also
Varbola Stronghold

References

 

Villages in Rapla County
Kreis Harrien